Dolores Prida (September 5, 1943 – January 20, 2013) was a Cuban-American columnist and playwright. Catherine E. Shoichet of CNN said that she was a "Latina Dear Abby".

She wrote for a weekly column of the El Diario La Prensa. She also contributed to Latina magazine and the New York Daily News. At Latina she wrote her "Dolores Dice" ("Dolores says" in Spanish) column. Prida was a founding member of the Latina magazine.

History
Prida was born on September 5, 1943 in Caibarién, Cuba. She was the oldest of three children. She had two sisters, Lourdes and Maria. While she was a teenager, Prida wrote poetry and short stories. Shortly after the completion of the Cuban Revolution, her father left for the United States, fleeing in a boat. In 1961, two years after the departure of their father, Prida and her mother and two siblings left Cuba. The family settled in New York City. Prida lived in New York City for the rest of her life. She attended Hunter College, taking night classes while working at a bakery. She later entered the publishing industry and became a journalist.

In the 1970s and 1980s she became the senior editor of Nuestro magazine, the managing editor of El Tiempo, Visión magazine's New York correspondent, the director of information services of the National Puerto Rican Forum, the literary manager of the International Arts Relations (INTAR), and the publications director of the Association of Hispanic Arts (AHA).

Prida published her first play in 1977. For her playwrighting she won the Cintas Fellowship Award for Literature in 1976, the Creative Artistic Public Service Award for Playwriting in 1976, and the Excellence in Arts Award in 1987. The Manhattan Borough President presented her with the third award. Mount Holyoke College granted her an honorary degree, a Doctor of Humane Letters, in 1989.   Her best known one act plays is "Coser y Cantar", a monologue about two characters named Ella and She.

In 1998 Prida took control of Latina's advice column. She had no prior training in writing advice.

She died on the morning of January 20, 2013, at Mount Sinai Hospital in New York City. Her cause of death is not yet known, and her family placed a request for an autopsy.

Works
Plays
 Beautiful Señoritas (1977)
 Beggars Soap Opera (1979)
 Coser y cantar (1981)
 Pantallas (1986)
 Botánica (1991)
 Casa Propia (1999, means "A House of Her Own")
 Four Guys Named José (2000)
 Una Mujer Named Maria (2000, "una mujer" means "a woman")

Poetry
 37 poemas (1967)

Reception
In The New York Times, D. J. R. Buckner said that in Casa Propia, "[n]ot much more is needed for comedy than throwing these broadly drawn strong characters together" and that in regards to the characters, "Fanny, Olga, Manolo and Junior are likely to live with you for a long time." He said that Prida "has a good ear for New York Hispanic street language, and this cast exploits it so hilariously that at times even a viewer with no Spanish may want to set aside the simultaneous translation earphones and take it in raw: the grimaces and gestures reveal what is meant, and the sound is too good to miss."

References

External links
 

1943 births
2013 deaths
American people of Cuban descent
American advice columnists
American women columnists
Hispanic and Latino American journalists
Hispanic and Latino American dramatists and playwrights
Writers from New York City
American women dramatists and playwrights
20th-century American dramatists and playwrights
20th-century American women writers
American women non-fiction writers
20th-century American non-fiction writers
21st-century American women